The Kansas City Zephyr was a streamliner passenger train service operated by the Chicago, Burlington and Quincy Railroad (CB&Q) between Chicago and Kansas City.

Overview 
The largest fleet of named streamliners in the United States were the Burlington's Zephyrs. Competing in markets against the famed Eagles, Chiefs, 400's, Cities and Hiawathas on almost every route, the polished Zephyrs covered almost every route on the mainline of the Burlington and for years held the speed/distance title in the record books. 

The Kansas City Zephyr made its inaugural run on February 1, 1953, as an all-new daylight streamliner between Chicago and Kansas City. The new train was prompted by the completion the previous October of the $16-million "Kansas City Shortcut", 49 miles of new track that made the route shorter, flatter, and straighter.  The new alignment shaved two hours off of the previous shortest route, and made CB&Q optimistic that it could compete successfully against its entrenched rival, the AT&SF, on this busy route. A new modern station was built at West Quincy, Missouri (1953) and operated until 1993, when Mississippi River flooding (levee breached) destroyed the facility.

Kansas City Zephyr (KCZ) #36 departed Kansas City at 12:01 pm, arriving in Chicago at 8:00 pm.  Westbound counterpart #35 departed the Windy City at 12:30 pm, arriving in Kansas City at 8:45 pm.  The original consist included two Vista-Domes, coaches, diner, and observation car, all built by Budd.  The CB&Q simultaneously launched an overnight Chicago-Kansas City service on the same route under the banner of the American Royal Zephyr.
The Kansas City Zephyr never lived up to ridership expectations, and it was not long before equipment from the KCZ was being shuffled off to other trains.  Intense competition came from the Santa Fe, which ran six daily streamliners in each direction between the city pair on a shorter schedule than CB&Q.  On April 10, 1968, just over 15 years after its promising beginning, the KCZ was discontinued, becoming a nameless local train between Chicago and West Quincy, MO.

Budd car consist 
The Kansas City Zephyr had two consists, a dorm-buffet-lounge car and a square-end parlor-observation car in each.

 320 Silver Garden - dorm-buffet-lounge
 321 Silver Patio - dorm-buffet-lounge
 365 Silver Terrace - parlor-observation
 366 Silver Tower - parlor-observation

Two of the original railcars from the Kansas City Zephyr are still in use today.  The Silver Garden, 1952 Budd Dome Lounge Coach and the Silver Terrace, 1952 Budd Dome Observation cars current operate on the Branson Scenic Railway in Branson, Missouri.

Subsequent service on the route 
The Illinois Zephyr and Carl Sandburg, passenger trains operated by Amtrak that run 258 miles (415 km) between Chicago and Quincy, Illinois, are the descendants of the Kansas City Zephyr and American Royal Zephyr passenger train routes operated by the Chicago, Burlington and Quincy Railroad until 1968 and 1971. The name Zephyr is preserved in the current name of the Illinois Zephyr.

Station stops 
Original Kansas City Zephyr, station stops:
Illinois
Chicago Union Station
La Grange Road station
Aurora Old CB&Q station (abandoned and largely demolished)
Plano station
Mendota station
Princeton station
Kewanee station
Galesburg CB&Q Seminary Street station (demolished)
Bushnell Old CB&Q Station (No longer a stop) Relocated to the Western Illinois Threshers grounds in Hamilton, Illinois.
Macomb station
Quincy station
Missouri
West Quincy CB&Q station (entire town abandoned after the Great Flood of 1993).
Macon (CB&Q station)
Brookfield (CB&Q station)
Kansas City station

References

External links

Burlington Route Historical Society
Amtrak's Illinois Service
Amtrak's Southwest Chief

Named passenger trains of the United States
North American streamliner trains
Passenger trains of the Chicago, Burlington and Quincy Railroad
Night trains of the United States
Passenger rail transportation in Illinois
Passenger rail transportation in Missouri
Railway services introduced in 1953
Railway services discontinued in 1968